Anastasios Triantafyllou (born May 30, 1987) is a Greek weightlifter. Triantafyllou represented Greece at the 2008 Summer Olympics in Beijing, where he competed for the men's middle-heavyweight category (94 kg), along with his compatriot Konstantinos Gkaripis. He successfully lifted 155 kg in the single-motion snatch, and hoisted 196 kg in a two-part, shoulder-to-overhead clean and jerk, for a total of 351 kg, finishing behind his compatriot Gkaripis by nine kilograms in fifteenth place.

In 2009 Triantafyllou was suspended for 2 years after he failed a drug test for methylhexanamine doping.

References

External links
NBC Olympics Profile

Greek male weightlifters
1987 births
Living people
Olympic weightlifters of Greece
Weightlifters at the 2008 Summer Olympics
Sportspeople from Heraklion
Doping cases in weightlifting